Bruce D. Kimball (born June 11, 1963) is an American diver and coach. He won a silver medal for the 10 meter platform at the 1984 Summer Olympics.

Kimball was born in Ann Arbor, Michigan. His father is Dick Kimball, who coached nine divers to Olympic medals. His brother is punk rock drummer Jim Kimball.

In October 1981, Kimball was struck head-on by a drunken driver. Every bone in his face was fractured, his left leg broken, the ligaments in his knee torn, his liver was lacerated, he had a depressed skull fracture and his spleen had to be removed. When he returned to diving in the summer of 1982, he made the World Championships on platform and earned a bronze medal as well as the nickname "The Comeback Kid."

At the 1984 Summer Olympics, he overtook Li Kongzheng with his final dive to win the silver medal, placing behind fellow American Greg Louganis.

On August 1, 1988, two weeks before the U.S. Olympic diving trials, Kimball, drunk, plowed into a crowd of teenagers while driving an estimated , killing two boys and severely injuring four others. Despite the tragedy, Kimball took part in the trials, but failed to make the team. He subsequently pleaded guilty to two counts of vehicular manslaughter and was sentenced to seventeen years in prison. He was released on November 24, 1993, after serving less than five years. As a part of his sentence, his driving privileges were “permanently” revoked by Judge Harry Coe, and were reinstated in 2018.

Kimball is a Kinetic Wellness teacher and diving coach for the swimming and diving teams at New Trier High School in Winnetka, Illinois. As of 2008, he is married and has three children.

References

 "Sincerely, Bruce D. Kimball", St Petersburg Times, by Susan Taylor Martin, July 27, 2003.
 "Kimball, who killed two teens, can get driver's license again", CBS Sports Online, December 22, 2004.

1963 births
Living people
Divers at the 1984 Summer Olympics
Sportspeople from Ann Arbor, Michigan
Olympic silver medalists for the United States in diving
American male divers
Pan American Games medalists in diving
Medalists at the 1984 Summer Olympics
World Aquatics Championships medalists in diving
Pan American Games silver medalists for the United States
Divers at the 1983 Pan American Games
Medalists at the 1983 Pan American Games
Sportspeople convicted of crimes